The Mountain is a 1991 Swiss drama film directed by Markus Imhoof. It was entered into the 41st Berlin International Film Festival. The film was selected as the Swiss entry for the Best Foreign Language Film at the 64th Academy Awards, but was not accepted as a nominee.

Cast
 Susanne Lothar as Lena
 Mathias Gnädinger as Manser
 Peter Simonischek as Kreuzpointner
 Agnes Fink as Mutter Manser
 Jürgen Cziesla as Direktor
 Adolf Laimböck as Oberst
 Heinrich Beens as Pfarrer
 Ingold Wildenauer as Eisenbahner
 Branko Samarovski as Jetzeler (as Branko Samarowsky)
 Hans-Rudolf Twerenbold as Mann am Stammtisch
 Barbara Schneider as Freundin
 Herbert Müller as Fotograf

See also
 List of submissions to the 64th Academy Awards for Best Foreign Language Film
 List of Swiss submissions for the Academy Award for Best Foreign Language Film

References

External links

1991 films
Swiss German-language films
1991 drama films
Films directed by Markus Imhoof
Films set in the Alps
Swiss drama films
1990s German-language films